This is a list of known governors of Mauretania Tingitana. It was one of the imperial provinces, governed by an appointee of the emperor, in this case a member of the equites. Some governors of Mauretania Tingitana were assigned to simultaneously govern the neighboring province of Mauretania Caesariensis; their names appear in bold.

References 

 
Mauretania Tingitana
Mauretania Tingitana
Mauretania Tingitana